K5, K05 or K-5 may be:

Places
 Gasherbrum I, the 11th highest mountain peak in the world
 K-5 (Kansas highway), a state highway in Kansas
 K5 Plan, vast defensive belt along the Cambodian-Thai border

Transportation
 Wings of Alaska, IATA airline designator
 Kinner K-5, a light general and sport aircraft engine

Vehicles
 , a Royal Navy submarine sunk in 1921
 , a 1914 United States Navy K-class submarine
 PRR K5, a 1929 American experimental 4-6-2 "Pacific" type steam locomotive
 LNER Class K5, a class of British steam locomotives 
 GSR Class K5, an 1894 Irish steam locomotive
 Chevrolet K5 Blazer, a 1969-91 full size SUV
 Kia Optima, a car branded as K5 in some markets

Weaponry
 Daewoo Precision Industries K5, a pistol used by the South Korean military
 Krupp K5, a railway gun of World War II Germany
 Kaliningrad K-5, a Soviet-era air-to-air missile
 K-5 (SLBM), a submarine-launched ballistic missile

Technology
 AMD K5, a CPU chip released in the 1990s
 Kerberos protocol version 5
 Pentax K-5, a digital SLR camera released in 2010 by Hoya Corporation
 kuro5hin, a collaborative discussion website
 Knightscope, a surveillance robot

Other
 K5 (band), Breakbeat artists
 Ibanez K5, the signature bass for KoRn's bassist Fieldy
 K-5 (education), kindergarten through grade 5
 K5, in graph theory, the complete graph used in Kuratowski's theorem
 KING5, a television station in Seattle, Washington, USA
 The former branding of KFVE-TV (now KHII-TV), a television station in Honolulu, Hawaii
 KHNL, a television station in Honolulu, Hawaii that currently carries "K5" branding on subchannel

See also